WEXP may refer to:
 WEXP (FM), a radio station (101.5 FM) licensed to Brandon, Vermont, United States
 WEXP (La Salle University), a former campus carrier current radio station at La Salle University in Philadelphia, Pennsylvania, United States which used this as a self-assigned identifier
 WLGQ, an Alabama radio station founded at Gadsden State College, which held the WEXP call sign from 1974 until 1985